Sébastien Enjolras (4 April 1976 – 3 May 1997) was a French racing driver. Considered to be one of the most promising French drivers of his generation, he was killed in a crash during practice for the 1997 24 Hours of Le Mans race, aged 21.

Career
Enjolras was born in Seclin.  He was the son of Michel Enjolras, a preparer of rally cars, and the brother of Pascal, a rally driver.  He began racing karts in 1989.  In 1994, he moved up to formula racing, finishing third in the Formula Renault Campus championship.  He moved to the senior domestic championship in 1995, finishing seventh in the championship.  He stayed on for another year and won the title in 1996 for the La Filière team, ahead of future Formula One drivers Sébastien Bourdais and Franck Montagny.  This performance was partially overshadowed when he failed a drug test at the end of the year, testing positive for cannabis.  Although banned for six months, he was not stripped of his championship and returned to racing when it expired.  For 1997, he moved up to the French Formula Three Championship with La Filière, and finished a posthumous thirteenth in the final standings.

Enjolras also tried sports car racing in 1996, when he drove one of the Welter Racing team's cars in the LMP2 class of the Le Mans 24 Hours alongside compatriots William David and Arnaud Trévisiol, the Peugeot-powered entry failing to finish.  He returned with the team for 1997.

Death
On a pre-qualifying run for the Le Mans 24 Hours a month before the race, the rear bodywork detached from Enjolras' car, causing it to become airborne and fly over the safety barriers after the Arnage corner. The car overturned and exploded at high speed, killing Enjolras instantly. Welter withdrew Enjolras' and its other entries, and single-piece bodywork was subsequently banned.

The scene of Enjolras' crash is currently denoted by a memorial stone behind the Armco barriers.

Racing record

Career summary

See also
List of 24 Hours of Le Mans fatal accidents

References

1976 births
1997 deaths
People from Seclin
24 Hours of Le Mans drivers
French racing drivers
Racing drivers who died while racing
Sport deaths in France
Sportspeople from Nord (French department)